Northeast India (officially the North Eastern Region (NER)) is the easternmost region of India representing both a geographic and political administrative division of the country. It comprises eight states—Arunachal Pradesh, Assam, Manipur, Meghalaya, Mizoram, Nagaland and Tripura (commonly known as the "Seven Sisters"), and the "brother" state Sikkim.

The Siliguri Corridor connects the region to the rest of mainland India.

The states of North Eastern Region are officially recognised under the North Eastern Council (NEC), constituted in 1971 as the acting agency for the development of the north eastern states. Long after induction of NEC, Sikkim formed part of the North Eastern Region as the eighth state in 2002. India's Look-East connectivity projects connect Northeast India to East Asia and ASEAN. Guwahati city in Assam is called the Gateway to the North East and is the largest metropolis in North East India.

History

The earliest settlers may have been Austroasiatic speakers from Southeast Asia, followed by Tibeto-Burman speakers from China, and by 500 BCE Indo-Aryan speakers from the Gangetic Plains as well as Kra–Dai speakers from southern Yunnan and Shan State. Due to the biodiversity and crop diversity of the region, archaeological researchers believe that early settlers of Northeast India had domesticated several important plants. Writers believe that the 100 BCE writings of Chinese explorer Zhang Qian indicate an early trade route via Northeast India. The Periplus of the Erythraean Sea mentions a people called Sêsatai in the region, who produced malabathron, so prized in the old world. Ptolemy's Geographia (2nd century CE) calls the region Kirrhadia, apparently after the Kirata population.

In the early historical period (most of the first millennium CE), Kamarupa straddled most of present-day Northeast India, besides Bhutan and Sylhet in Bangladesh. Xuanzang, a travelling Chinese Buddhist monk, visited Kamarupa in the 7th century CE. He described the people as "short in stature and black-looking", whose speech differed a little from central India and who were of simple but violent disposition. He wrote that the people in Kamarupa knew of Sichuan, which lay to the kingdom's east beyond a treacherous mountain.

The northeastern states were established during the British Raj of the 19th and early 20th centuries, when they became relatively isolated from traditional trading partners such as Bhutan and Myanmar. Many of the peoples in present-day Mizoram, Meghalaya and Nagaland converted to Christianity under the influence of British (Welsh) missionaries.

Formation of North Eastern states

In the early 19th century, both the Ahom and the Manipur kingdoms fell to a Burmese invasion.  The ensuing First Anglo-Burmese War resulted in the entire region coming under British control. In the colonial period (1826–1947), North East India was made a part of Bengal Province from 1839 to 1873, after which Colonial Assam became its own province, but which included Sylhet.

After Indian Independence from British Rule in 1947, the Northeastern region of British India consisted of Assam and the princely states of Tripura Kingdom and Manipur Kingdom.  Subsequently, Nagaland in 1963, Meghalaya in 1972, Arunachal Pradesh in 1975 (capital changed to Itanagar) (formed on 20 February 1987) and Mizoram in 1987 were formed out of the large territory of Assam. Manipur and Tripura remained Union Territories of India from 1956 until 1972, when they attained fully-fledged statehood. Sikkim was integrated as the eighth North Eastern Council state in 2002.

The city of Shillong served as the capital of the Assam province created during British Rule. It remained the capital of undivided Assam until the formation of the state of Meghalaya in 1972. The capital of Assam was shifted to Dispur, a part of Guwahati, and Shillong was designated as the capital of Meghalaya.

World War II

In 1944, the Japanese planned a daring attack on British India. Traveling through Burma, its forces were stopped at Kohima and Imphal by British and Indian troops. This marked the furthest western expansion of the Japanese Empire; its defeat in this area presaged Allied victory.

Sino-Indian War (1962)

Arunachal Pradesh, a state in the Northeastern tip of India, is claimed by China as South Tibet. Sino-Indian relations degraded, resulting in the Sino-Indian War of 1962. The cause of the escalation into war is still disputed by both Chinese and Indian sources. During the war in 1962, the PRC (China) captured much of the NEFA (North-East Frontier Agency) created by India in 1954. But on 21 November 1962, China declared a unilateral ceasefire, and withdrew its troops  behind the McMahon Line. It returned Indian prisoners of war in 1963.

Seven Sister States

The Seven Sister States is a popular term for the contiguous states of Arunachal Pradesh, Assam, Meghalaya, Manipur, Mizoram, Nagaland and Tripura prior to inclusion of the state of Sikkim into the North Eastern Region of India. The sobriquet 'Land of the Seven Sisters' was coined to coincide with the inauguration of the new states in January 1972 by Jyoti Prasad Saikia, a journalist in Tripura, in the course of a radio talk show. He later compiled a book on the interdependence and commonness of the Seven Sister States. It has been primarily because of this publication that the nickname has caught on.

Geography

The Northeast region can be physiographically categorised into the Eastern Himalaya, the Patkai and the Brahmaputra and the Barak valley plains. Northeast India (at the confluence of Indo-Malayan, Indo-Chinese, and Indian biogeographical realms) has a predominantly humid sub-tropical climate with hot, humid summers, severe monsoons, and mild winters. Along with the west coast of India, this region has some of the Indian subcontinent's last remaining rainforests, which support diverse flora and fauna and several crop species. Reserves of petroleum and natural gas in the region are estimated to constitute a fifth of India's total potential.

The region is covered by the mighty Brahmaputra-Barak river systems and their tributaries. The states of Arunachal Pradesh and Sikkim have a montane climate with cold, snowy winters and mild summers.

Topography

Highest peaks

Brahmaputra River Basin

Tributaries of the Brahmaputra River in Northeast India:

Climate

Northeast India has a subtropical climate that is influenced by its relief and influences from the southwest and northeast monsoons. The Himalayas to the north, the Meghalaya plateau to the south and the hills of Nagaland, Mizoram and Manipur to the east influences the climate. Since monsoon winds originating from the Bay of Bengal move northeast, these mountains force the moist winds upwards, causing them to cool adiabatically and condense into clouds, releasing heavy precipitation on these slopes. Temperatures are moderate in the Brahmaputra and Barak valley river plains which decreases with altitude in the hilly areas. At the highest altitudes, there is permanent snow cover. In general, the region has 3 seasons: Winter, Summer, and rainy season in which the rainy season coincides with the summer months much like the rest of India. Winter is from early November until mid March while summer is from mid-April to mid-October.

Under the Köppen climate classification, the region is divided into 3 broad types: A (tropical climates), C (warm temperate mesothermal climates), and D (snow microthermal climates). The tropical climates are located in parts of Manipur, Tripura, Mizoram, and the Cachar plains south of 25oN and are classified as tropical wet and dry (Aw). The entire Brahmaputra valley has a humid subtropical climate (Cfa/Cwa) with hot summers. At altitudes between  located in the eastern hills of Nagaland, Manipur and Arunachal Pradesh, a (Cfb/CWb) climate prevails with warm summers. Locations above  in Meghalaya, parts of Nagaland, and northern Arunachal Pradesh have a (Cfc/Cwc) climate with short and cool summers. Finally, the extreme northern parts of Arunachal Pradesh are classified as humid continental climates with mean winter temperatures below .

Temperature
Temperatures vary by altitude with the warmest places being in the Brahmaputra and Barak River plains and the coldest at the highest altitudes. It is also influenced by proximity to the sea with the valleys and western areas being close to the sea, which moderates temperatures. Generally, temperatures in the hilly and mountainous areas are lower than the plains which lie at a lower altitude. Summer temperatures tend to be more uniform than winter temperatures due to high cloud cover and humidity.

The highest temperatures in summer occur before the arrival of monsoons and thus eastern areas have the highest temperatures in June and July where the monsoon arrives later than western areas. In the Cachar Plain, located south of the Brahmaputra plain, temperatures are higher than the Brahmaputra plain although the temperature range is smaller owing to higher cloud cover and the monsoons that moderate night temperatures year round.

In the mountainous areas of Arunachal Pradesh, the Himalayan ranges in the northern border with India and China experience the lowest temperatures with heavy snow during winter and temperatures that drop below freezing. Areas with altitudes exceeding  receive snowfall during winters and have cool summers. In the hilly areas of Meghalaya, Nagaland, Manipur and Mizoram, winters are cold while summers are cool.

The plains in Manipur has colder winter minimums than what is warranted by its elevation owing to being surrounded by hills on all sides. This is due to temperature inversions during winter nights when cold air descends from the hills
into the valleys below and its geographic location which prevents winds that bring hot temperatures and humidity from coming into the Manipur plain.

Rainfall
Areas in the Brahmputra valley receive  of rainfall a year while mountainous areas receive  a year. The southwest monsoon is responsible for bringing 90% of the annual rainfall to the region. April to late October are the months where most of the rainfall in Northeast India occurs with June and July being the rainiest months. In most parts of the region, the average date of onset of the monsoons is 1 June. Southern areas are the first to receive the monsoon (May or June) with the Brahmaputra valley and the mountainous north receiving later (later May or June). In the hilly parts of Mizoram, the closer proximity to the Bay of Bengal causes it to experience early monsoons with June being the wettest season.

High-risk seismic zone

The North Eastern Region of India is a mega-earthquake prone zone caused by active fault planes beneath formed by the convergence of three tectonic plates viz. India Plate, Eurasian Plate and Burma Plate. Historically the region has suffered from two great earthquakes (M > 8.0) – 1897 Assam earthquake and 1950 Assam-Tibet earthquake – and about 20 large earthquakes (8.0 > M > 7.0) since 1897. The 1950 Assam-Tibet earthquake is still the largest earthquake in India.

Wildlife

Flora

WWF has identified the entire Eastern Himalayas as a priority Global 200 ecoregion. Conservation International has upscaled the Eastern Himalaya hotspot to include all the eight states of Northeast India, along with the neighbouring countries of Bhutan, southern China and Myanmar.

The region has been identified by the Indian Council of Agricultural Research as a center of rice germplasm. The National Bureau of Plant Genetic Resources (NBPGR), India, has highlighted the region as being rich in wild relatives of crop plants. It is the center of origin of citrus fruits. Two primitive variety of maize, Sikkim Primitive 1 and 2, have been reported from Sikkim (Dhawan, 1964). Although jhum cultivation, a traditional system of agriculture, is often cited as a reason for the loss of forest cover of the region, this primary agricultural economic activity practiced by local tribes supported the cultivation of 35 varieties of crops. The region is rich in medicinal plants and many other rare and endangered taxa. Its high endemism in both higher plants, vertebrates, and avian diversity has qualified it as a biodiversity hotspot.

The following figures highlight the biodiversity significance of the region:
 51 forest types are found in the region, broadly classified into six major types – tropical moist deciduous forests, tropical semi-evergreen forests, tropical wet evergreen forests, subtropical forests, temperate forests, and alpine forests.
 Out of the nine important vegetation types of India, six are found in the North Eastern Region.
 These forests harbor 8,000 out of 15,000 species of flowering plants. In floral species richness, the highest diversity is reported from the states of Arunachal Pradesh (5000 species) and Sikkim (4500 species) amongst the North Eastern states.
 According to the Indian Red Data Book, published by the Botanical Survey of India, 10 percent of the flowering plants in the country are endangered. Of the 1500 endangered floral species, 800 are reported from Northeast India.
 Most of the North Eastern states have more than 60% of their area under forest cover, a minimum suggested coverage for the hill states in the country in order to protect from erosion.
 Northeast India is a part of Indo-Burma hotspot. This hotspot is the second largest in the world, next only to the Mediterranean Basin, with an area  among the 25 identified.

Fauna

The International Council for Bird Preservation, UK identified the Assam plains and the Eastern Himalaya as an Endemic Bird Area (EBA). The EBA has an area of 220,000 km2 following the Himalayan range in the countries of Bangladesh, Bhutan, China, Nepal, Myanmar and the Indian states of Sikkim, North Bengal, Assam, Nagaland, Manipur, Meghalaya and Mizoram. Because of a southward occurrence of this mountain range in comparison to other Himalayan ranges, this region has a distinctly different climate, with warmer mean temperatures and fewer days with frost, and much higher rainfall. This has resulted in the occurrence of a rich array of restricted-range bird species. More than two critically endangered species, three endangered species, and 14 vulnerable species of birds are in this EBA. Stattersfield et al. (1998) identified 22 restricted range species, out of which 19 are confined to this region and the remaining three are present in other endemic and secondary areas. Eleven of the 22 restricted-range species found in this region are considered as threatened (Birdlife International 2001), a number greater than in any other EBA of India.

Northeast India is very rich in faunal diversity. There are as many as 15 species of non-human primates and most important of them are hoolock gibbon, stumptied macaque, pigtailed macaque, golden langur, hanuman langur and rhesus monkey. The most important and endangered species is one-horned rhinoceros. The forests of the region are also the habitats of elephant, royal Bengal tiger, leopard, golden cat, fishing cat, marbled cat, Bengal fox etc. the Gangetic dolphin in the Brahmaputra is also an endangered species. The other endangered species are otter, mugger crocodile, tortoise and some fishes.

WWF has identified the following priority ecoregions in North-East India:
 Brahmaputra Valley semi-evergreen forests
 Eastern Himalayan broadleaf forests
 Eastern Himalayan subalpine conifer forests
 Northeast India–Myanmar pine forests

National Parks

State Symbols

Demographics

The total population of Northeast India is 46 million with 68 percent of that living in Assam alone. Assam also has a higher population density of 397 persons per km2 than the national average of 382 persons per km2.  The literacy rates in the states of the Northeastern region, except those in Arunachal Pradesh and Assam, are higher than the national average of 74 percent. As per 2011 census, Meghalaya recorded the highest population growth of 27.8 percent among all the states of the region, higher than the national average at 17.64 percent; while Nagaland recorded the lowest in the entire country with a negative 0.5 percent.

Largest cities by population

According to 2011 Census of India, the largest cities in Northeast India are

Languages

Northeast India constitutes a single linguistic region within the Indian national context, with about 220 languages in multiple language families (Indo-European, Sino-Tibetan, Kra–Dai, Austroasiatic, as well as some creole languages) that share a number of features that set them apart from most other areas of the Indian subcontinent (such as alveolar consonants rather than the more typical dental/retroflex distinction). Assamese, an Indo-Aryan language spoken mostly in the Brahmaputra Valley, developed as a lingua franca for many speech communities.  Assamese-based pidgin/creoles have developed in Nagaland (Nagamese) and Arunachal (Nefamese), though Nefamese has been replaced by Hindi in recent times.  The Austro-Asiatic family is represented by the Khasi, Jaintia and War languages of Meghalaya. A small number of Tai–Kadai languages (Ahom, Tai Phake, Khamti, etc.) are also spoken. Sino-Tibetan is represented by a number of languages that differ significantly from each other, some of which are: Boro, Rabha, Karbi, Mising, Tiwa, Deori, Biate etc. (Assam); Garo, Hajong, Biate (Meghalaya) Ao, Angami, Sema, Lotha, Konyak etc. (Nagaland); Mizo, Hmar, Paite, etc. (Mizoram); Hrusso, Tanee, Nisi, Adi, Abor, Nocte, Apatani, Misimi etc. (Arunachal). Meitei is the official language in Manipur, the dominant language of the Imphal Valley; while "Naga" languages such as Poumai, Mao, Maram, Rongmei (Kabui) and Tangkul, and Kuki-Chin languages such as Thadou-Kuki, Mizo, Paite, Simte and Hmar predominate in individual hill areas of the state.

Among other Indo-Aryan languages, Bengali language is spoken in South Assam in the Barak Valley, where Bengali is an official language. Chakma is also an Indo-Aryan language spoken in Mizoram. Besides the Sino-Tibetan Tripuri language, Bengali is a majority language in Tripura. Nepali, an Indo-Aryan language, is dominant in Sikkim, besides the Sino-Tibetan languages Limbu, Bhutia, Lepcha, Rai, Tamang, Sherpa, etc. Bengali was made the official language of Colonial Assam from 1836 to 1873.

Official languages

Etymology of state names

Religions

Ethnic groups
Northeast India has over 220 ethnic groups and an equal number of dialects in which Bodo form the largest indigenous ethnic group. The hills states in the region like Arunachal Pradesh, Meghalaya, Mizoram, and Nagaland are predominantly inhabited by tribal people with a degree of diversity even within the tribal groups. The region's population results from ancient and continuous flows of migrations from Tibet, Indo-Gangetic India, the Himalayas, present Bangladesh, and Myanmar.

Majority communities
These ethnic groups form significant majorities in the states/regions of Northeast India:

 Assamese people - (48.38%), largest ethnicity in Assam
 Nishi people - (20.74%), largest ethnicity in Arunachal Pradesh 
 Bodo people - (30.47%), largest ethnicity in Bodoland region of Assam
 Bengali people - (63.48% and 80.84%), largest ethnicity in Tripura state and Barak Valley region of Assam
 Meitei people (AKA Manipuri people) - (53.3%), largest ethnicity in Manipur
 Mizo people (AKA Lusei people) - (73.14%), largest ethnicity in Mizoram
 Khasi people - (46.24%), largest ethnicity in Meghalaya
 Naga people - (88.24%), largest ethnicity in Nagaland
 Nepali people - (62.6%), largest ethnicity in Sikkim

Minority communities
These ethnic groups form minorities in the states of Northeast India:

Culture

Cuisines

Arts 
The Manipuri Raas Leela dance (from Manipur) and the Sattriya (from Assam) have been included in the elite category of the "Classical Dances of India", as officially recognised by both the Sangeet Natak Akademi and the Ministry of Culture (India). Besides these, all tribes in Northeast India have their own folk dances associated with their religion and festivals. The tribal heritage in the region is rich with the practice of hunting, land cultivation and indigenous crafts. The rich culture is vibrant and visible with the traditional attires of each community.

All states in Northeast India share the handicrafts of bamboo and cane, wood carving, making traditional weapons and musical instruments, pottery and handloom weaving. Traditional tribal attires are made of thick fabrics primarily with cotton. Assam silk is a famous industry in the region.

Music

Northeast is a hub of different genres of music. Each community has its own rich heritage of folk music. Talented musicians and singers are plentifully found in this part of the country. The Assamese singer-composer Bhupen Hazarika achieved national and international fame with his remarkable creations. Another famous singer from Assam, Pratima Barua Pandey is a well-known folk singer. Zubeen Garg, Papon, Anurag Saikia are some other notable singers, musicians from the state of Assam. Tangkhul Naga folk blue singer like Rewben Mashangva, who comes from Ukhrul, is an acclaimed Folk singer whose music is inspired by the like of Bob Dylan and Bob Marley. Another famous folk singing band from Nagaland popularly known as Tetseo Sisters is one to be noted for their original music genre. However, younger generation has started pursuing western music more and more nowadays. The northeast region has seen a significant increase in musical innovation in the 21st century.

Literature

Many of the Northeast Indian indigenous communities have an ancient heritage of folktales which tell the tale of their origin, rituals, beliefs and so on. These tales are transmitted from one generation to another in oral form. They are remarkable instances of tribal wisdom and imagination. However, Assam, Tripura and Manipur have some ancient written texts. These states were mentioned in the great Hindu epic Mahabharata. The Saptakanda Ramayana in Assamese by Madhava Kandali is considered the first translation of the Sanskrit Ramayana into a modern Indo-Aryan Language. Karbi Ramayana bears witness to the old heritage of written literature in Assam. Two writers from the Northeast, viz., Birendra Kumar Bhattacharya and Mamoni Raisom Goswami, have been awarded Jnanpith, the highest literary award in India. Hence, Birendra Kumar Bhattacharya was the first Assamese writer and from the Northeast India to receive Jnanpith Award for his Assamese novel Mrityunjay(1979). Mamoni Raisom Goswami was awarded the Jnanpith Award in the year 2000. Nagen Saikia is the first writer from Assam and the Northeast India, to have been conferred the Sahitya Akademi Fellowship by the Sahitya Akademi. The last quarter of the 20th century saw the rise of modern literature in the Northeast. Most of the writers, especially the tribal writers, are bilingual, that is, they write both in their mother-tongue and English. Some of the general features of this literature are—retrieval of folklore, celebration of folk culture, identity politics, reaction to the insurgency and counter-insurgency operations, depiction of natural beauty, changes meted out by time, etc. The major writers of Northeast Literature are--(from Assam) Lakshminath Bezbaroa, Homen Borgohain, Birendra Kumar Bhattacharya, Harekrishna Deka, Rongbong Terang, Nilmani Phukan, Indira Goswami, Hiren Bhattacharyya, Mitra Phukan, Jahnavi Barua, Dhruba Hazarika, Rita Chowdhury, D N Bezbarua, Nilim Kumar, Anupama Basumatary, Uddipana Goswami, Aruni Kashyap; (from Arunachal Pradesh) Mamang Dai; (from Manipur) Robin S Ngangom, Ratan Thiyam, Thangjam Ibopishak, Gambhini Devi, T Bijoykumar Singh; (from Meghalaya) Kynpham Sing Nongkynrih, Esther Syiem, Desmond Kharmawphlang, Paul Lyngdoh, Anjum Hassan; (from Mizoram) Mona Zote; (from Nagaland) Temsula Ao, Cherrie Chhangte, Easterine Kire; (from Sikkim) Sudha M Rai, Rajendra Bhandari (from Tripura) Chandrakanta Murasingh. Temsula Ao is the first writer from Northeast India to be awarded the Sahitya Akademi Award (2013) in the Indian English Literature category for her collection of short stories, Laburnum for My Head, and Padmashree (2007). Easterine Kire is the first English novelist hailed from Nagaland. She received The Hindu Literary Prize (2015) for her novel When the River Sleeps. Indira Goswami, alias Mamoni Roisom Goswami, is an acclaimed Assamese writer whose novels include Moth-Eaten Howda of the Tusker, Pages Stained with Blood, The Shadow of Kamakhya and The Blue-Necked God. Mamang Dai won the Sahitya Akademi Award (2017) for her novel The Black Hill.

Festivals 

Indigenous festivals in the northeast include the Ojiale festival of the Wancho people, Chhekar festival of the Sherdukpen people, Longte Yullo festival of Nishis, Solung festival of Adis, Losar festival of Monpas, Reh festival of Idu Mishmis and Dree festival of Apatani. Mamita Tripurabda(Tring festival), Buisu, Hangrai, Hojagiri, Kharchi and Garia festivals of Tripura,  In Manipur popular festivals include Ningol Chakouba and the Manipur boat racing festival or the Heikru Hidongba.

Administration and political disputes

International borders management
 McMahon Line and China–India border crossings patrolled by Indo-Tibetan Border Police and Special Frontier Force with China along Sikkim and Arunachal Pradesh
 India-Bangladesh border and crossings patrolled by Border Security Force along Assam, Meghalaya, Tripura and Mizoram 
 India–Myanmar border, crossings patrolled by Assam Rifles and Indian Army along Arunachal Pradesh, Nagaland, Manipur and Mizoram
 India-Bhutan borders patrolled by Sashastra Seema Bal along Sikkim, Assam and Arunachal Pradesh
 India-Nepal border patrolled by Sashastra Seema Bal along Sikkim

Pan-states development authorities
 Ministry for Development of North Eastern Region (DoNER)
 North Eastern Council

States and sub-divisions

Government
The northeastern states, having 3.8% of India's total population, are allotted 25 out of a total of 543 seats in the Lok Sabha. This is 4.6% of the total number of seats.

20th century separatist unrest

In 1947 Indian independence and partition resulted in the North East becoming a landlocked region. This exacerbated the isolation that has been recognized, but not studied. East Pakistan controlled access to the Indian Ocean. The mountainous terrain has hampered the construction of road and railways connections in the region.

Several militant groups have formed an alliance to fight against the governments of India, Bhutan, and Myanmar, and now use the term "Western Southeast Asia" (WESEA) to refer to the region. The separatist groups include the Kangleipak Communist Party (KCP), Kanglei Yawol Kanna Lup (KYKL), People's Revolutionary Party of Kangleipak (PREPAK), People's Revolutionary Party of Kangleipak-Pro (PREPAK-Pro), Revolutionary People's Front (RPF) and United National Liberation Front (UNLF) of Manipur, Hynniewtrep National Liberation Council (HNLC) of Meghalaya, Kamatapur Liberation Organization (KLO), which operates in Assam and North Bengal, National Democratic Front of Bodoland and ULFA of Assam, and the National Liberation Front of Tripura (NLFT).

Economy

The Ministry of Development of North Eastern Region (MDoNER) is the deciding body under Government of India for socio-economic development in the region. The North Eastern Council under MDoNER serves as the regional governing body for Northeast India. The North Eastern Development Finance Corporation Ltd. (NEDFi) is a Public Limited Company providing assistance to micro, small, medium and large enterprises within the northeastern region (NER). Other organizations under MDoNER include North Eastern Regional Agricultural Marketing Corporation Limited (NERAMAC), Sikkim Mining Corporation Limited (SMC) and North Eastern Handlooms and Handicrafts Development Corporation (NEHHDC).

Industries

Agriculture

The economy is agrarian. Little land is available for settled agriculture. Along with settled agriculture, jhum (slash-and-burn) cultivation is still practised by a few indigenous groups of people.
The inaccessible terrain and internal disturbances has made rapid industrialisation difficult in the region.

Tourism

Living Root Bridges

Northeast India is also the home of many living root bridges. In Meghalaya, these can be found in the southern Khasi and Jaintia Hills. They are still widespread in the region, though as a practice they are fading out, with many examples having been destroyed in floods or replaced by more standard structures in recent years. Living root bridges have also been observed in the state of Nagaland, near the Indo-Myanmar border.

Newspapers and Magazines

Northeast India has several newspapers in both English and regional languages. The largest circulated English daily in Assam is The Assam Tribune. In Meghalaya, The Shillong Times is the highest circulated newspaper. In Nagaland, Nagaland Post has the highest number of readers. G Plus is the only print and digital English weekly tabloid published from Guwahati. In Manipur, Imphal Free Press is a highly respected newspaper. In Arunachal Pradesh, The Arunachal Times is the highest circulated newspaper in Arunachal Pradesh.

Transportation

Air

States in the North Eastern Region are well connected by air-transport conducting regular flights to all major cities in the country. The states also own several small airstrips for military and private purposes which may be accessed using Pawan Hans helicopter services. The region currently has two international airports viz. Lokapriya Gopinath Bordoloi International Airport, Bir Tikendrajit International Airport Maharaja Bir Bikram Airport conducting flights to Thailand, Myanmar, Nepal and Bhutan. While the airport in Sikkim is under-construction, Bagdogra Airport  remains the closest domestic airport to the state.

Railway

Railway in Northeast India is delineated as Northeast Frontier Railway zone of Indian Railways. The regional network is underdeveloped. States of Manipur, Meghalaya, Mizoram and Sikkim will remain almost disconnected till March 2023 when the capital cities of Manipur Mizoram and-Nagaland are expected to get the rail links once the under construction rail projects are completed.

Look East Policy

In the 21st century, there has been recognition among policymakers and economists of the region that the main stumbling block for economic development of the Northeastern region is the disadvantageous geographical location. It was argued that globalisation propagates deterritorialisation and a borderless world which is often associated with economic integration. With 98 percent of its borders with China, Myanmar, Bhutan, Bangladesh and Nepal, Northeast India appears to have a better scope for development in the era of globalisation. As a result, a new policy developed among intellectuals and politicians that one direction the Northeastern region must be looking to as a new way of development lies with political integration with the rest of India and economic integration with the rest of Asia and Oceania, with North, East and Southeast Asia, Micronesia and Polynesia in particular, as the policy of economic integration with the rest of India did not yield much dividends. With the development of this new policy, the Government of India directed its Look East policy towards developing the Northeastern region. This policy is reflected in the Year End Review 2004 of the Ministry of External Affairs, which stated that: "India’s Look East Policy has now been given a new dimension by the UPA Government. India is now looking towards a partnership with the Association of Southeast Asian Nations ASEAN countries, both within BIMSTEC and the India-ASEAN Summit dialogue as integrally linked to economic and security interests, particularly for India’s East and North East region."

Development and connectivity projects
The north-east (NE) region of India lags behind the rest of the country in several development indicators. Although infrastructure has developed over the years, the region has to go a long way to level up the national standard. The total road network of about 377 thousand km of NE contributes about 9.94 per cent of the total roads in the country. Road density in terms of road length per thousand square kilometers. area is very poor in hilly state of Arunachal Pradesh, Mizoram, Meghalaya and Sikkim, while it is significantly high in Tripura and Assam. The road length per 100 km2 area in NE districts varies from as less as below 10 km (in Arunachal Pradesh) to more than 200 km (in Tripura). Other means of transport such as rail, air and water is insignificant in NE (except Assam); however, a few cities of these states having direct air connectivity in the region. The total railway network in the NE is 2,602 km (as on 2011), which is only about 4 per cent of the total rail network of the country. Constructions of roads build the road map for development and road is the only means of mass transport for the entire NE of India. Due to hilly terrain and varied altitudes, rail transport is mainly confined to Assam and water transport is almost non-existent.

India's road network has benefited greatly from the articulation of the National Highways Development Project (NHDP). The Ministry has formulated the Special Accelerated Road Development Programme for North East (SARDP-NE) for the development/improvement of more than 10,000 km roads in the NE states. The Ministry of Road Transport and Highways (MoRTH) has been paying special attention to the development of national highways in the region and has assigned 10 per cent of the total allocation of fund for the NE region.

Another major constraint of surface infrastructure projects in the NE states has to be linked up with parallel developments in the neighboring countries, particularly with Bangladesh. The restoration and extension of pre-partition land and river transit routes through Bangladesh is vital for transport infrastructure in NE states. Other international cooperation, such as, revival of Ledo road (Stilwell road) connecting Ledo in Assam to northern Myanmar and extended up to Kunming in south-eastern China, Kaladan Multimodal Transit Project and Trans-Asian Railways, could open up an eastern window for the land-locked NE states of India. Various regional initiatives, such as, the Bangladesh–China–India–Myanmar (BCIM) and Bay of Bengal Initiative for Multi-Sectoral Technical and Economic Cooperation (BIMSTEC), India–Myanmar–Thailand Trilateral Highway (IMTTH) project to link the markets of South and Southeast Asia, are in very initial stages.

 NE road, rail, air services, water, power, and tourism projects 
 Look-East connectivity projects with ASEAN and SAARC

See also

Battle of the Tennis Court
Laskar Committee Report
Ledo Road (Stillwell Road)
List of Christian denominations in Northeast India
Literature from North East India
Political integration of India
History of Ladakh
List of indigenous peoples of South Asia
 East India
 North India
 South India
 Central India
 Western India
 Administrative divisions of India

References

Citations

Sources cited

External links

 Ministry of Development of North Eastern Region
 Know India/States
 Northeast India Tourism
 

 
Regions of India
Tourism in Northeast India